Frank Le Blond Kloeb (June 16, 1890 – March 11, 1976), also known as Frank L. Kloeb, was a Democratic United States Representative from Ohio and a United States district judge of the United States District Court for the Northern District of Ohio.

Education and career

Kloeb (grandson of Francis Celeste Le Blond)  was born in Celina, Ohio. He attended the parochial and public schools, Ohio State University at Columbus and the University of Wisconsin–Madison. During the First World War, Kloeb enlisted as a seaman in the United States Navy, advanced to quartermaster, third class, and then to ensign, and served from September 1917 to March 1919. He graduated from the Ohio State University Moritz College of Law in 1917, was admitted to the bar the same year and commenced practice in Celina in April 1919. He served as prosecuting attorney of Mercer County, Ohio, from 1921 to 1925.

Congressional service

Kloeb was elected as a Democrat to the 73rd United States Congress and reelected to the two succeeding Congresses. He served from March 4, 1933, until August 19, 1937, when he resigned to accept a federal judicial appointment.

Federal judicial service

Kloeb was nominated by President Franklin D. Roosevelt on June 18, 1937, to a seat on the United States District Court for the Northern District of Ohio vacated by Judge George Philip Hahn. He was confirmed by the United States Senate on June 22, 1937, and received his commission on August 20, 1937. He served as Chief Judge from 1959 to 1960. He assumed senior status on September 30, 1964. His service terminated on March 11, 1976, due to his death in Toledo, Ohio. He was interred in Calvary Cemetery.

Family

Kloeb and his wife, formerly Florence Root, had one daughter.

References

Sources
  Retrieved on 2008-01-24.

External links

 
 

1890 births
1976 deaths
Ohio lawyers
Judges of the United States District Court for the Northern District of Ohio
United States district court judges appointed by Franklin D. Roosevelt
20th-century American judges
Ohio State University Moritz College of Law alumni
County district attorneys in Ohio
University of Wisconsin–Madison alumni
United States Navy personnel of World War I
People from Celina, Ohio
Democratic Party members of the United States House of Representatives from Ohio